A list of films produced by the Israeli film industry in 1999.

1999 releases

Unknown premiere date

Awards

See also
1999 in Israel

References

External links
 Israeli films of 1999 at the Internet Movie Database

Israeli
Film
1999